Nouméa Magenta Airport  is a domestic airport on the main island of New Caledonia. In 2017, 428,679 passengers used the airport.

Air Calédonie has its head office on the airport property.

History 

 1931: First biplane flight on the beach in Magenta, located on the east coast of Nouméa.
 1942: Arrival of the Poppy Force, a US Army division commanded by General Alexander Patch, making New Caledonia one of the main Pacific airbases for the US Army. A military airfield is built along the beach in Magenta by Seabees of Naval Construction Battalion 11 on the site of a former racetrack.
 1970s: Construction of the first terminal, with a capacity of 100,000 people.
 2001: Completion and opening of the new terminal, increasing capacity to over 300,000 people.

Airlines and destinations

Statistics

References

External links
 Official site  (French)

See also

 Nouméa-La Tontouta Airport
 List of airports in New Caledonia

Airports in New Caledonia
Magenta Airport
Seabees